Böyük Dəhnə (also, Bëyuk Dakhna, Beyuk-Degne, Beyuk-Dekhna, Beyyuk-Dakhna, and Byuyuk-Dakhne) is a village and municipality in the Shaki Rayon of Azerbaijan.  It has a population of 5,255. 

İn 1902 some ancient artifacts, including the 1st or 2nd-century stone with Greek inscription were found here. The square stone, being 145 cm long and 50 cm wide, reads: "Of blessed memory of benevolent Eunon, Aelius Iason". The evidence was first published in 1904.

References 

Populated places in Shaki District